Wanderers Football Club also known as Wanderers is a former soccer club based in Parramatta, Australia. Founded in 1880, the club is considered to be the first soccer club in Australia.

History
The club was founded on 3 August 1880, by English-emigrate John Walter Fletcher, after he called a meeting at Aarons Hotel, Sydney, to promote the English game of soccer to the new colony.

Wanderers played their first match on 14 August 1880, against the Kings School rugby team. Wanderers won 5–0 in front of a crowd of 1,000 at Parramatta Common. The match is considered to be the first played under the Laws of the Game in Australia.

Colours and crest
Wanderers wore a white jersey, cap, knickerbockers and blue stockings, with a Southern Cross badge over the left breast.

Grounds
The club played games at both Parramatta Common and Moore Park.

References

Soccer clubs in Sydney
Sport in Parramatta
Association football clubs established in 1880
1880 establishments in Australia